This is a list of terms related to oncology.  The original source for this list was the US National Cancer Institute's public domain Dictionary of Cancer Terms.

0–9 
10-propargyl-10-deazaaminopterin
– 12-O-tetradecanoylphorbol-13-acetate
– 13-cis retinoic acid
– 17-N-allylamino-17-demethoxygeldanamycin
– 18F-EF5
– 1H-nuclear magnetic resonance spectroscopic imaging
– 2-methoxyestradiol
– 2IT-BAD monoclonal antibody 170
– 3-aminopyridine-2-carboxaldehyde thiosemicarbazone
– 3-AP
– 3-dimensional conformal radiation therapy
– 3-dimensional radiation therapy
– 4-demethoxydaunorubicin
– 4-hydroxytamoxifen
– 4-nitroquinoline 1-oxide
– 4-NQO
– 5-FU
– 5-hydroxyindoleacetic acid
– 5-hydroxytryptamine
– 506U78
– 5Q- syndrome
– 6-hydroxymethylacylfulvene
– 9-cis retinoic acid
– 90Y-DOTA-biotin

A 
A33 monoclonal antibody
– AAP
– abarelix
– ABCD rating
– ABI-007
– ABT-510
– ABT-751
– ABX-EGF
– accelerated phase
– ACE inhibitor
– acetylcysteine
– achlorhydria
– acitretin
– acoustic neurofibromatosis
– acridine carboxamide
– acrylonitrile
– actinic keratosis
– action study
– Activase
– acute erythroid leukemia
– acute lymphoblastic leukemia
– acute lymphocytic leukemia
– acute myelogenous leukemia
– acute myeloid leukemia
– acute nonlymphocytic leukemia
– AD 32
– adenocarcinoma
– adenoid cystic cancer
– adenoma
– adenopathy
– adenosine triphosphate
– adenovirus
– adjunct agent
– adjunctive therapy
– adjuvant therapy
– adrenocortical
– Adriamycin
– adult T-cell leukemia/lymphoma
– AE-941
– AEE788
– aerobic metabolism
– aerobic respiration
– aerodigestive tract
– aerosolize
– aflatoxin
– AFP
– AG013736
– AG2037
– AG3340
– AG337
– agent study
– agglutinin
– aggressive lymphoma
– agnogenic myeloid metaplasia
– agonist
– agranulocytosis
– AJCC staging system
– alanine aminopeptidase
– alanine transferase
– alanosine
– aldesleukin
– alemtuzumab
– alendronate sodium
– alkalinization
– alkylating agent
– ALL
– all-trans retinoic acid
– allogeneic
– allogeneic bone marrow transplantation
– allogeneic stem cell transplantation
– allogenic
– allopurinol
– Allovectin-7
– aloe-emodin
– alopecia
– alpha-fetoprotein
– Alteplase
– altretamine
– aluminium sulfate
– ALVAC-CEA vaccine
– Amanita phalloides
– Ambien
– amelanotic melanoma
– Ames, Bruce
– amifostine
– amikacin
– aminocamptothecin
– aminoglutethimide
– aminoglycoside antibiotic
– aminolevulinic acid
– aminopterin
– AML
– amonafide
– amoxicillin
– amphotericin B
– ampulla
– ampulla of Vater
– amputation
– amsacrine
– amylase
– amyloidosis
– anagrelide
– anakinra
– anaphylactic shock
– anaplastic
– anaplastic large cell lymphoma
– anaplastic thyroid cancer
– anastomosis
– anastrozole
– androgen
– androgen ablation
– androgen suppression
– androgen-independent
– anecdotal report
– anemia
– anetholtrithione
– Angelica root
– angiogenesis
– angiogenesis inhibitor
– angioimmunoblastic T-cell lymphoma
– angiosarcoma
– angiostatin
– angiotensin-converting enzyme inhibitor
– anhydrovinblastine
– anidulafungin
– animal model
– annamycin
– anorexia
– ansamycin
– antagonist
– anterior mediastinotomy
– anterior mediastinum
– anthracenedione
– anthracycline
– anthraquinone
– anti-CEA antibody
– anti-idiotype vaccine
– anti-inflammatory
– antiandrogen
– antiandrogen therapy
– anti-angiogenesis
– antiangiogenic
– antibody
– antibody therapy
– anticachexia
– anticancer antibiotic
– anticarcinogenic
– anticoagulant
– anticonvulsant
– antidepressant
– antiemetic
– antiestrogen
– antifolate
– antifungal medication
– antigen
– antigen-presenting cell
– antigen-presenting cell vaccine
– antiglobulin test
– antihormone therapy
– antimetabolite
– antimicrotubule agent
– antimitotic agent
– antineoplastic
– antineoplastic antibiotic
– antioxidant
– antiparasitic
– antiretroviral therapy
– antisense c-fos
– antithymocyte globulin
– antituberculosis
– antitumor antibiotic
– Antiviral drug
– anxiolytic
– APC
– APC vaccine
– APC8015
– apheresis
– aplastic anemia
– aplidine
– apocrine gland
– apolizumab
– apoptosis
– appendix
– arctigenin
– arctiin
– arginine butyrate
– aromatase inhibitor
– arsenic trioxide
– arteriogram
– arteriography
– asbestos
– ascites
– asparaginase
– aspartate transaminase
– aspergillosis
– Aspergillus
– asthenia
– astrocyte
– astrocytoma
– asymptomatic
– atamestane
– ataxia
– ataxia-telangiectasia
– ataxic gait
– atelectasis
– athymic nude mouse
– ATLL
– ATP
– atrasentan
– atypical hyperplasia
– ATRT atypical teratoid/rhabdoid tumor
– augmerosen
– autoimmune disease
– autologous
– autologous bone marrow
– autologous bone marrow transplantation
– autologous lymphocyte
– autologous stem cell transplantation
– autologous tumor cell
– Avastin
– axilla
– axillary artery
– axillary bud
– axillary dissection
– axillary lymph node
– axillary lymph node dissection
– axillary nerve
– axillary vein
– azacitidine
– azoxymethane
– AZQ
– AZT

B 
B cell
– B lymphocyte
– B3 antigen
– B43-PAP immunotoxin
– B7-1
– Bacillus Calmette Guérin
– bacterial toxin
– barium enema
– barium solution
– barium swallow
– Barrett's esophagus
– basal cell
– basal cell carcinoma
– basal cell nevus syndrome
– basophil
– batimastat
– BAY 12-9566
– BAY 43-9006
– BAY 56-3722
– BAY 59-8862
– BB-10901
– BBBD
– BBR 2778
– BBR 3464
– BCG
– BCG solution
– bcl-2 antisense oligodeoxynucleotide G3139
– BCX-1777
– Beckwith-Wiedemann syndrome
– beclomethasone
– Bellini duct carcinoma
– bendamustine
– benign
– benign proliferative breast disease
– benign prostatic hyperplasia
– benign prostatic hypertrophy
– benign tumor
– benzaldehyde
– benzoylphenylurea
– benzydamine
– Beriplast P
– best practice
– beta alethine
– beta carotene
– beta hemolytic streptococcus group B
– beta-endorphin
– beta-glucan
– beta-human chorionic gonadotropin
– bevacizumab
– bexarotene
– Bexxar regimen
– BG00001
– BI-RADS
– Biafine cream
– BIBX 1382
– bicalutamide
– bidi (oncology)
– bilateral cancer
– bilateral nephrectomy
– bilateral prophylactic mastectomy
– bilateral salpingo-oophorectomy
– bile duct
– biliary
– bilirubin
– binding agent
– bioavailable
– biochanin A
– biochemical reactions
– biological response modifier
– biological therapy
– biomarker
– Biomed 101
– biopsy
– biopsy specimen
– biotherapy
– Birt–Hogg–Dube syndrome
– bispecific antibody
– bispecific monoclonal antibody
– bisphosphonate
– bizelesin
– BL22 immunotoxin
– black cohosh
– black snakeroot
– blast
– blast crisis
– blast phase
– bleomycin
– blessed thistle
– blinded study
– blood cell count
– blood chemistry study
– blood thinner
– blood transfusion
– blood–brain barrier
– blood–brain barrier disruption
– BMS-182751
– BMS-184476
– BMS-188797
– BMS-214662
– BMS-247550
– BMS-275291
– BMS-354825
– Bolus (medicine)
– bolus infusion
– bone marrow
– bone marrow ablation
– bone marrow aspiration
– bone marrow biopsy
– bone marrow metastases
– bone marrow transplantation
– bone metastases
– bone scan
– bone-seeking radioisotope
– Boron neutron capture therapy
– boronophenylalanine-fructose complex
– bortezomib
– Bowen's disease
– BPH
– brachial plexopathy
– brachial plexus
– brachytherapy
– brain metastasis
– brainstem glioma
– brain stem tumor
– brain tumor
– BRCA1
– BRCA2
– breakthrough pain
– breast cancer in situ
– breast density
– breast duct endoscopy
– Breast Imaging Reporting and Data System
– breast implant
– breast reconstruction
– breast self-exam
– breast-conserving surgery
– breast-sparing surgery
– Brief Pain Inventory
– BRIP1
– brivudine
– BRM
– bromelain
– bronchiole
– bronchitis
– bronchoscope
– bronchoscopy
– bronchus
– brostallicin
– broxuridine
– bryostatin 1
– buccal mucosa
– budesonide
– bupropion
– burdock
– Burkitt's leukemia
– Burkitt's lymphoma
– burr hole
– buserelin
– buspirone
– busulfan
– buthionine sulfoximine

C 
C cell
– c-erbB-2
– c-kit
– CA 19-9 assay
– CA-125
– CA-125 test
– cachexia
– calcitonin
– calcitriol
– CAM
– Campath-1H
– camptothecin
– camptothecin analog
– cancer
– cancer induction
– Cancer Information Service
– cancer of unknown primary origin
– cancer stem cell
– cancer vaccine
– Cancer.gov
– Candidiasis
– Candidosis
– CAP-1
– capecitabine
– capsaicin
– captopril
– carbendazim
– carbogen
– carbon-11 acetate
– carboplatin
– carboxyamidotriazole
– carboxypeptidase-G2
– carcinoembryonic antigen
– carcinoembryonic antigen peptide-1
– carcinogen
– carcinogenesis
– carcinoid
– carcinoid syndrome
– carcinoma
– carcinoma in situ
– carcinomatosis
– carcinosarcoma
– carcinosis
– carcinostatic
– cardin (oncology)
– carmustine
– carnitine
– carotenoid
– carzelesin
– case report
– case series
– case-control study
– caspofungin acetate
– Castleman's disease
– CAT scan
– catechol
– cauterization
– cauterize
– cBR96-doxorubicin immunoconjugate
– CC-1088
– CC-49 monoclonal antibody
– CC-5013
– CC-8490
– CCI-779
– CD34 antigen
– CD40-ligand
– CEA
– CEA assay
– cecum
– cefalexin
– cefepime
– cefixime
– ceftriaxone
– celecoxib
– celiac disease
– cell
– cell differentiation
– cell motility
– cell proliferation
– cell respiration
– cell adhesion
– cellular adoptive immunotherapy
– cellular metabolism
– cellulitis
– central nervous system primitive neuroectodermal tumor
– central venous access catheter
– CEP-2563 dihydrochloride
– CEP-701
– cephalosporin
– ceramide
– cerebellar hemangioblastoma
– cerebellopontine
– cerebral hemisphere
– cerebrospinal fluid
– cerebrospinal fluid diversion
– cervical
– cervical intraepithelial neoplasia
– cervix
– cetuximab
– cevimeline
– CGP 48664
– Chamberlain procedure
– chemoembolization
– chemoimmunotherapy
– chemoprevention
– chemoprevention studies
– chemoprotective
– chemoradiation
– chemoradiotherapy
– chemosensitivity
– chemosensitivity assay
– chemosensitizer
– chemotherapeutic agent
– chemotherapy
– chemotherapy-induced peripheral neuropathy
– chest x-ray
– chiasma
– child-life worker
– chitin
– chlorambucil
– chlorine
– chloroma
– chloroquinoxaline sulfonamide
– cholangiocarcinoma
– cholangiosarcoma
– cholelith
– cholestasis
– chondrocyte
– chondroitin sulfate
– chondrosarcoma
– chordoma
– chorioallantoic membrane
– choriocarcinoma
– choroid plexus tumor
– CHPP
– chronic granulocytic leukemia
– chronic idiopathic myelofibrosis
– chronic leukemia
– chronic lymphoblastic leukemia
– chronic lymphocytic leukemia
– chronic myelogenous leukemia
– chronic myeloid leukemia
– chronic myelomonocytic leukemia
– chronic phase
– chronic phase chronic myelogenous leukemia
– CHS 828
– CI-1033
– CI-958
– CI-980
– CI-994
– ciclosporin
– cidofovir
– cilengitide
– cimetidine
– Cipro
– ciprofloxacin
– circulatory system
– cirrhosis
– CIS
– cisplatin
– citric acid/potassium-sodium citrate
– cladribine
– clarithromycin
– clear cell adenocarcinoma
– clear-cell sarcoma
– clear cell sarcoma of the kidney
– clinical breast exam
– clinical resistance
– clinical series
– clinical study
– clinical trial
– CLL
– clodronate
– clofarabine
– CML
– CMML
– CMV
– cnicin
– CNS
– CNS metastasis
– CNS prophylaxis
– CNS sanctuary
– CNS tumor
– co-culture
– co-trimoxazole
– coactivated T cell
– cobalt 60
– Cockayne syndrome
– coenzyme Q10
– cohort study
– COL-3
– cold nodule
– Coley's toxins
– collagen disease
– collagenase
– collecting duct
– coloanal anastomosis
– coloanal pull-through
– Colorectal cancer (colon cancer)
– colon polyp
– colonoscope
– colonoscopy
– colony-stimulating factor
– colorectal
– colposcope
– colposcopy
– combination chemotherapy
– combretastatin A4 phosphate
– comedo carcinoma
– common bile duct
– comorbidity
– compassionate use trial
– complementary and alternative medicine
– complete blood count (CBC)
– complete hysterectomy
– complete metastasectomy
– complete remission
– complete response
– compound nevus
– compression bandage
– computed tomographic colonography
– computed tomography
– computed tomography colography
– computerized axial tomography
– computerized tomography
– concurrent therapy
– condylomata acuminata
– cone biopsy
– congestive heart failure
– conization
– consecutive case series
– consolidation therapy
– contiguous lymphoma
– continent reservoir
– contingency management
– continuous hyperthermic peritoneal perfusion
– continuous infusion
– contralateral
– control animal
– control group
– controlled clinical trial
– controlled study
– conventional therapy
– conventional treatment
– cooperative group
– CoQ10
– cordectomy
– cordycepin
– core biopsy
– corticosteroid
– Corynebacterium granulosum
– coumestan
– coumestrol
– CP-358,774
– CP-609,754
– CP-724,714
– CP4071
– CpG 7909
– CPT 11
– CQS
– craniopharyngioma
– craniotomy
– creatine
– creatinine
– cribriform
– crisnatol mesylate
– Crohn's disease
– cryopreservation
– cryosurgery
– cryotherapy
– cryptorchidism
– CSF
– CT scan
– CT-2103
– CT-2106
– CT-2584
– CTC
– cultured cell
– cultured cell line
– cumulative dose
– curcumin
– cutaneous breast cancer
– cutaneous T-cell lymphoma
– cyanogenic glucoside
– cyclooxygenase-2 selective inhibitor
– cyclophosphamide
– cyclosporine
– cyproheptadine
– cyproterone acetate
– cyst
– cystectomy
– cystosarcoma phyllodes
– cystoscope
– cystoscopy
– cytarabine
– cytochlor
– cytogenetics
– cytokine
– cytology
– cytomegalovirus
– cytopenia
– cytoplasm
– cytotoxic
– cytotoxic chemotherapy
– cytotoxic T cell

D 
D-20761
– da-huang
– dacarbazine
– dacliximab
– daclizumab
– dactinomycin
– daidzein
– dalteparin
– danazol
– darbepoetin alfa
– darkfield microscope
– Data Safety and Monitoring Committee
– daunorubicin
– DCIS
– de novo
– death cap
– debulking operation
– decitabine
– decortication
– deferoxamine
– defibrotide
– degenerative disease
– dehydroepiandrosterone
– delayed-type hypersensitivity response
– dendritic cell
– dendritic cell vaccine
– denileukin diftitox
– dental implant
– deoxycytidine
– deoxyribonucleic acid
– DepoFoam-encapsulated cytarabine
– depsipeptide
– dermatofibrosarcoma protuberans
– dermatologist
– dermis
– DES
– deslorelin
– desmoid tumor
– desmoplastic
– desmoplastic melanoma
– desmoplastic small round cell tumor
– dexamethasone
– dexmethylphenidate
– dexrazoxane
– dextroamphetamine-amphetamine
– dextromethorphan acetic acid
– DFMO
– DHA-paclitaxel
– DHEA
– di-dgA-RFB4 monoclonal antibody
– diagnosis
– diagnostic mammogram
– diagnostic procedures
– diagnostic trial
– diathermy
– diaziquone
– didanosine
– DIEP flap
– diethylstilbestrol
– differentiation
– difluoromethylornithine
– digital mammography
– digital photography
– digital rectal examination
– dihematoporphyrin ether
– dimesna
– dimethyl sulfoxide
– dimethylxanthenone acetic acid
– diphosphonate
– dipyridamole
– disease progression
– disease-free survival
– disease-specific survival
– distal
– distal pancreatectomy
– distant cancer
– distraction
– disulfiram
– DJ-927
– DNA
– docetaxel
– dock
– dolasetron
– dolastatin 10
– donepezil
– dose
– dose-dense chemotherapy
– dose-dependent
– dose-limiting
– dose-rate
– dosimetrist
– double-blinded
– double-contrast barium enema
– doubling time
– doxercalciferol
– doxorubicin
– doxycycline
– DRE
– dronabinol
– drug tolerance
– dry orgasm
– DTGM fusion protein
– ductal carcinoma
– ductal carcinoma in situ
– ductal lavage
– Dukes' classification
– dumping syndrome
– duodenitis
– DX-52-1
– DX-8951f
– dyscrasia
– dysesthesia
– dysgeusia
– dysphagia
– dysplasia
– dysplastic nevi
– dysplastic nevus
– dyspnea

E 
E7070
– E7389
– EBV
– ecchymosis
– echocardiography
– ecteinascidin 743
– ectocervical
– edatrexate
– edotecarin
– edrecolomab
– efaproxiral
– effector cell
– efficacy
– eflornithine
– EGb761
– EGFR
– EKB-569
– electroacupuncture
– electrodesiccation
– electrolarynx
– electroporation therapy
– eligibility criteria
– embolism
– embolization
– embryoma
– embryonal rhabdomyosarcoma
– embryonal tumor
– embryonic
– EMD 121974
– emitefur
– emodin
– enalapril
– encephalopathy
– enchondroma
– endocervical curettage
– endocrine cancer
– endocrine pancreas cell
– endocrine therapy
– endometrial
– endometrial biopsy
– endometrial disorder
– endometrial hyperplasia
– Endometrial intraepithelial neoplasia
– endometriosis
– endometrium
– endorectal ultrasound
– endoscope
– endoscopic retrograde cholangiopancreatography
– endoscopic ultrasound
– endoscopy
– endostatin
– endothelial cell
– endothelin receptor antagonist
– endothelin-1 protein receptor antagonists
– eniluracil
– enoxaparin
– ENT
– enterostomal therapist
– enucleation
– enveloped virus
– eosinophil
– eosinophilia
– EP-2101
– ependymal tumor
– ependymoma
– epidemiology
– epidermal growth factor receptor
– epidermoid carcinoma
– epigastric
– epiglottis
– epinephrine
– epipodophyllotoxin
– epirubicin
– epithelial
– epithelial carcinoma
– epithelial ovarian cancer
– epithelium
– epitope
– EPO906
– epoetin alfa
– epoetin beta
– epothilone
– epothilone B
– epothilone D
– epratuzumab
– Epstein-Barr virus
– EPT
– ER
– ER+
– ER-
– ERA-923
– erb-38 immunotoxin
– ErbB1
– ERCP
– erlotinib
– ERT
– ERUS
– erythema
– erythrocyte
– erythrocyte sedimentation rate
– erythrodysplasia
– erythroid dysplasia
– erythroleukemia
– erythroleukoplakia
– erythroplakia
– erythropoietin
– esophageal
– esophagectomy
– esophagitis
– esophagoscopy
– esophagram
– esophagus
– ESR
– essential thrombocythemia
– essential thrombocytosis
– estradiol
– estramustine
– estramustine phosphate
– estrogen
– estrogen receptor
– estrogen receptor negative
– estrogen receptor positive
– estrogen receptor test
– estrogen replacement therapy
– etanercept
– etanidazole
– ethynyluracil
– etidronate
– etiology
– etoposide
– etoposide phosphate
– ETS
– evaluable disease
– evaluable patients
– everolimus
– Ewing's family of tumors
– Ewing's sarcoma
– exatecan mesylate
– excision
– excisional biopsy
– exemestane
– exisulind
– exocrine pancreas cell
– expanded access trial
– extensive-stage small cell lung cancer
– external radiation
– external-beam radiation
– extrahepatic
– extrapleural pneumonectomy

F 
false-negative test result
– false-positive test result
– familial adenomatous polyposis
– familial atypical multiple mole melanoma syndrome
– familial cancer
– familial dysplastic nevi
– familial polyposis
– Family history (medicine)
– FAMMM syndrome
– Fanconi anemia
– Fanconi syndrome
– FAP
– fatty-replaced breast tissue
– fazarabine
– fecal occult blood test
– fenretinide
– fentanyl
– fiber
– fibrin sealant
– fibroblast
– fibroid
– fibromatosis
– fibrosarcoma
– fibrosis
– fibrous
– fifth cranial nerve
– filgrastim
– filgrastim-SD/01
– finasteride
– fine-needle aspiration
– first-line therapy
– FK463
– flavonoid
– flavopiridol
– flecainide
– flow cytometry
– floxuridine
– flt3L
– fluconazole
– flucytosine
– fludarabine
– fludeoxyglucose F 18
– fludrocortisone
– fluoropyrimidine
– fluoroscope
– fluoroscopy
– fluorouracil
– fluoxetine
– flutamide
– FOBT
– folate
– folate antagonist
– FOLFOX
– folic acid
– follicular large cell lymphoma
– follicular mixed cell lymphoma
– follicular thyroid cancer
– formaldehyde
– FR901228
– fractionation
– free radical
– fulguration
– fulvestrant
– functional magnetic resonance imaging
– fundus
– fungating lesion
– fusion protein

G 
G-CSF
– gabapentin
– Gail model
– gallium nitrate
– gallium scan
– gamma knife
– gamma ray
– ganciclovir
– ganglioside
– gastrectomy
– gastric atrophy
– gastrinoma
– gastroenterologist
– gastroesophageal junction
– gastroesophageal reflux disease
– gastrointestinal
– gastrointestinal stromal tumor
– gastrointestinal tract
– gastroscope
– gastroscopy
– gefitinib
– geldanamycin analog
– GEM 231
– gemcitabine
– gemtuzumab ozogamicin
– gene expression profiling
– gene therapy
– gene transfer
– gene-modified
– genetic analysis
– genetic counseling
– genetic deletion
– genetic markers
– genetic susceptibility
– genetic testing
– genistein
– genitourinary system
– genome
– germ cell
– germ cell tumor
– German Commission E
– germinoma
– germline mutation
– Gerota's capsule
– Gerota's fascia
– gestational trophoblastic disease
– gestational trophoblastic neoplasia
– gestational trophoblastic tumor
– GI14721
– giant cell fibroblastoma
– gimatecan
– GIST
– Gleason score
– Gleevec
– Gliadel Wafer
– glial cell
– glial tumor
– glioblastoma
– glioblastoma multiforme
– glioma
– gliosarcoma
– glossectomy
– glucagon
– glucagonoma
– glucocorticoid
– gluconeogenesis
– glufosfamide
– glutamine
– glutathione
– glutathione S-transferase
– glycinamide ribonucleotide formyltransferase inhibitor
– glycolysis
– glycopeptide
– glycoprotein
– glycoprotein 100
– glycosaminoglycan
– GM-CSF
– GM2-KLH vaccine
– GnRH
– gonadotropin-releasing hormone
– gonadotropin-releasing hormone agonist
– Gonzalez regimen
– Gorlin syndrome
– goserelin
– gossypol
– gp100
– gp209-2M
– GPX-100
– grade IV astrocytoma
– graft-versus-host disease
– graft-versus-tumor
– granisetron
– granulocyte
– granulocyte colony-stimulating factor
– granulocytic sarcoma
– granulocytopenia
– granulosa cell tumor
– GTI-2040
– GVHD
– GW572016
– GW786034
– gynecologic
– gynecologic cancer
– gynecologic oncologist

H 
HAART
– hairy cell leukemia
– halofuginone hydrobromide
– Halsted radical mastectomy
– hamartoma
– hand-foot syndrome
– head and neck cancer
– Hedyotis diffusa
– HeLa
– helical computed tomography
– helper T cell
– hemagglutinin-neuraminidase
– hemangiopericytoma
– hemangiosarcoma
– hematogenous
– hematologic malignancy
– hematologist
– hematopoiesis
– hematopoietic growth factor
– hematopoietic tissue
– hematoporphyrin derivative
– hemilaryngectomy
– heparin
– hepatectomy
– hepatic
– hepatic arterial infusion
– hepatic artery
– hepatic portal vein
– hepatic veno-occlusive disease
– hepatoblastoma
– hepatocellular carcinoma
– hepatocyte
– hepatoma
– hepatomegaly
– HER1
– HER2/neu
– HER2/neu gene
– herba scutellaria barbatae
– hereditary leiomyomatosis and renal cell cancer syndrome
– hereditary mutation
– hereditary nonpolyposis colon cancer
– herpesvirus
– heterogenic
– hexyl 5-aminolevulinate
– high-dose chemotherapy
– high-dose-rate remote brachytherapy
– high-dose-rate remote radiation therapy
– high-energy photon therapy
– high-grade lymphoma
– high grade squamous intraepithelial lesion
– high-risk cancer
– highly active antiretroviral therapy
– hilar
– histamine dihydrochloride
– histiocytic lymphoma
– histologic examination
– histology
– histone
– histone deacetylase
– historic cohort study
– historical control subject
– HLA
– HNPCC
– Hodgkin's disease
– Hodgkin's lymphoma
– holmium Ho 166 DOTMP
– homoharringtonine
– hormonal therapy
– hormone receptor
– hormone receptor test
– hormone replacement therapy
– hormone responsive
– hormone therapy
– Horner's syndrome
– host cell
– hot nodule
– HPPH
– HPV
– HRT
– HTLV-1
– hu14.18-interleukin-2 fusion protein
– Huang Lian
– human epidermal growth factor receptor 2
– human leukocyte antigen
– human lymphocyte antigen
– human papillomavirus
– human T-cell leukemia virus type 1
– Hürthle cell neoplasm
– hydrazine sulfate
– hydromorphone
– hydronephrosis
– hydroureter
– hydroxychloroquine
– hydroxyurea
– hypercalcemia
– hyperfractionation
– hyperglycemia
– hypericum perforatum
– hypernephroma
– hyperplasia
– hypersensitivity
– hyperthermia therapy
– hyperthermic intraperitoneal chemoperfusion
– hyperthermic perfusion
– hyperthyroidism
– hyperuricemia
– hypervascular
– hypoglycemia
– hypopharynx
– hypotension
– hypothalamus
– hypothesis
– hypothyroidism
– hypoxia
– hypoxic
– hysterectomy

I 
ibandronate
– ICI 182,780
– ICI D1694
– idarubicin
– IDEC-Y2B8 monoclonal antibody
– idiopathic
– idiopathic myelofibrosis
– idoxifene
– idoxuridine
– ifosfamide
– IH636 grape seed extract
– IL-1
– IL-1-alfa
– IL-11
– IL-12
– IL-2
– IL-3
– IL-4
– IL-6
– ileostomy
– iloprost
– ILX-295501
– ILX23-7553
– IM-862
– imaging procedure
– imatinib mesylate
– imipenem
– imiquimod
– immune adjuvant
– immune function
– immune response
– immune system
– immune system tolerance
– immunoassay
– immunocompetence
– immunocompetent
– immunocompromised
– immunodeficiency
– immunodeficiency syndrome
– immunoglobulin
– immunological adjuvant
– immunology
– immunomodulation
– immunophenotyping
– immunoscintigraphy
– immunostimulant
– immunosuppression
– immunosuppressive
– immunosuppressive therapy
– immunotherapy
– immunotoxin
– in situ cancer
– incisional biopsy
– incomplete Freund's adjuvant
– indinavir
– indium In 111 ibritumomab tiuxetan
– indium In 111 pentetreotide
– indole-3-carbinol
– indolent lymphoma
– indometacin
– induction therapy
– infiltrating cancer
– infiltrating ductal carcinoma
– inflammatory breast cancer
– infliximab
– infrared coagulation
– inguinal orchiectomy
– inoperable
– inositol
– inositol hexaphosphate
– instillation
– Institutional Review Board
– intensification therapy
– Intensity Modulated Radiation Therapy
– intercalator
– interferon
– interleukin
– interleukin-1
– interleukin-1-alpha
– interleukin-11
– interleukin-12
– interleukin-2
– interleukin-3
– interleukin-4
– interleukin-4 PE38KDEL cytotoxin
– interleukin-4 PE38KDEL immunotoxin
– interleukin-6
– interleukin-7
– intermediate-grade lymphoma
– internal radiation
– interstitial radiation therapy
– intestinal villi
– intoplicine
– intracarotid infusion
– intracavitary
– intracavitary radiation
– intracellular
– intracolonic
– intracranial tumor
– intradermal
– intraductal carcinoma
– intraepithelial
– intrahepatic
– intrahepatic bile ducts
– intrahepatic infusion
– intralesional
– intraluminal intubation and dilation
– Intramuscular injection (IM)
– intraocular melanoma
– intraoperative radiation therapy
– intraperitoneal
– intraperitoneal chemotherapy
– Intraperitoneal hyperthermic chemoperfusion
– intraperitoneal infusion
– intraperitoneal radiation therapy
– intrapleural
– intrathecal
– intrathecal chemotherapy
– intratumoral, meaning within a tumour
– intravenous pyelogram
– intravenous pyelography
– intraventricular infusion
– intravesical
– invasive cancer
– invasive cervical cancer
– inverted papilloma
– investigational
– inviable
– iodine I 131 tositumomab
– iododoxorubicin
– ionomycin
– IORT
– Incontinentia pigmenti 
– IRB
– irinotecan
– irofulven
– irradiated
– irradiation
– irreversible toxicity
– iseganan hydrochloride
– ISIS 2503
– ISIS 3521
– ISIS 5132
– islet cell
– islet cell cancer
– islet of Langerhans cell
– isoflavone
– isointense
– isolated hepatic perfusion
– isolated limb perfusion
– isolated lung perfusion
– isotretinoin
– itraconazole
– IU
– IV
– IVP
– ixabepilone

J 
J-107088
– J-pouch coloanal anastomosis
– jaundice
– Jewett staging system
– JM 216
– junctional nevus
– juvenile myelomonocytic leukemia

K 
Kaposi's sarcoma
– karenitecin
– Karnofsky Performance Status
– keloid
– keratan sulfate
– keratinocyte growth factor
– keratoacanthoma
– ketoconazole
– ketorolac
– keyhole limpet hemocyanin
– KGF
– killer cell
– Kinaret
– Klatskin tumor
– Klebsiella
– Klinefelter syndrome
– KOS-862
– KPS
– kretek
– KRN5500
– KRN7000
– Krukenberg tumor
– KW2189

L 
L-377,202
– L-778,123
– L-carnitine (see Carnitine)
– laboratory study
– laboratory test
– lacrimal gland
– lactate dehydrogenase
– lactic acid dehydrogenase
– LAK cell
– lamina propria
– lamivudine
– lamotrigine
– laparoscope
– laparoscopic prostatectomy
– laparoscopic-assisted colectomy
– laparoscopy
– laparotomy
– lappa
– large cell carcinoma
– large granular lymphocyte
– laryngectomy
– laser surgery
– laser therapy
– LCIS
– LDH
– lectin
– leflunomide
– leiomyoma
– leiomyosarcoma
– lentinan
– lepirudin
– leptomeningeal
– leptomeningeal cancer
– leptomeningeal metastases
– leridistim
– lerisetron
– Leser-Trélat
– letrozole
– leucovorin
– leukapheresis
– leukemia
– leukocyte
– leukopenia
– leukoplakia
– leuprorelin
– leuvectin
– levamisole
– levocarnitine
– levofloxacin
– LGD1069
– LH-RH
– Lhermitte's sign
– Li-Fraumeni syndrome
– liarozole
– ligation
– light-emitting diode therapy
– lignan
– limb perfusion
– limited-stage small cell lung cancer
– linac
– liothyronine sodium
– lipophilic
– liposarcoma
– liposomal
– lisofylline
– Hepatocellular carcinoma (liver cancer)
– liver metastases
– liver scan
– LMB-1 immunotoxin
– LMB-2 immunotoxin
– LMB-7 immunotoxin
– LMB-9 immunotoxin
– lobaplatin
– lobectomy
– lobradimil
– lobular carcinoma in situ
– lobule
– local cancer
– local therapy
– localized gallbladder cancer
– locally advanced cancer
– lometrexol
– lomustine
– lonafarnib
– loop electrosurgical excision procedure
– loop excision
– loperamide hydrochloride
– losoxantrone
– low-grade lymphoma
– lower GI series
– LU 79553
– LU-103793
– lubricant
– lumbar puncture
– lumpectomy
– lung metastases
– lurtotecan
– luteinizing hormone-releasing hormone
– luteinizing hormone-releasing hormone agonist
– lutetium texaphyrin
– LY231514
– LY293111
– LY317615
– LY335979
– LY353381 hydrochloride
– lycopene
– lymph gland
– lymph node
– lymph node dissection
– lymph node drainage
– lymph node mapping
– lymph vessel
– lymphadenectomy
– lymphadenopathy
– lymphangiogram
– lymphangiography
– lymphangiosarcoma
– lymphatic fluid
– lymphatic mapping
– lymphatic system
– lymphatic vessel
– lymphedema
– lymphoblast
– lymphocyte
– lymphocytic
– lymphocytic leukemia
– lymphoepithelioma
– lymphography
– lymphoid
– lymphokine-activated killer cell
– lymphoma
– lymphomatoid granulomatosis
– lymphoproliferative disorder
– lymphosarcoma
– lymphoscintigraphy
– Lynch syndrome
– lysis
– lysosome
– lytic
– lytic lesion

M 
M protein
– macroglobulinemia
– macrophage
– mafosfamide
– MAGE-3
– magnetic resonance imaging
– magnetic resonance perfusion imaging
– magnetic resonance spectroscopic imaging
– magnetic-targeted carrier
– maintenance therapy
– malabsorption syndrome
– malignancy
– malignant
– malignant ascites
– malignant fibrous cytoma
– malignant fibrous histiocytoma
– malignant meningioma
– malignant mesothelioma
– malignant mixed Müllerian tumor
– malignant peripheral nerve sheath tumor
– malondialdehyde
– MALT lymphoma
– mammary
– mammogram
– mammography
– Mammotome
– mantle field
– marimastat
– mast cell
– mastectomy
– mastocytoma
– matrix metalloproteinase
– MDL 101,731
– MDX-060
– mean survival time
– measurable disease
– mechlorethamine
– MEDI-507
– medial supraclavicular lymph node
– median survival time
– mediastinal pleura
– mediastinoscopy
– mediastinum
– medical castration
– medical oncologist
– medroxyprogesterone
– medullary breast carcinoma
– medullary thyroid cancer
– medulloblastoma
– mega-voltage linear accelerator
– megestrol
– meiosis
– melanocyte
– melanoma
– melanoma vaccine
– melphalan
– MEN-10755
– MEN1 syndrome
– meningeal
– meningeal metastases
– meningioma
– menopausal hormone therapy
– mercaptopurine
– mercury
– Merkel cell cancer
– mesenchymal
– mesenteric membrane
– mesna
– mesonephroma
– mesothelioma
– metaplasia
– metaplastic carcinoma
– metastasectomy
– metastasis
– metastasize
– metastatic
– metastatic cancer
– metasynchronous
– meteorism
– methotrexate
– methoxsalen
– Methoxy polyethylene glycol-epoetin beta
– methyl-5-aminolevulinate
– methylphenidate
– methylprednisolone
– metoclopramide
– metronidazole
– metronomic therapy
– Mexican valerian
– MG98
– microcalcification
– micrometastases
– micromolar
– microsatellite
– microsatellite instability
– microstaging
– microwave therapy
– microwave thermotherapy
– mifepristone
– Miraluma test
– misoprostol
– mistletoe lectin
– mitochondria
– mitolactol
– mitomycin
– mitosis
– mitotane
– mitotic activity
– mitotic index
– mitotic inhibitor
– mitoxantrone
– mivobulin isethionate
– mixed glioma
– MLN2704
– modafinil
– modality
– modified radical mastectomy
– Mohs surgery
– molar pregnancy
– molecular risk assessment
– molecularly targeted therapy
– monoclonal antibody
– monoclonal antibody 3F8
– monocyte
– Montanide ISA-51
– Morinda citrifolia
– morphology
– motexafin gadolinium
– moxifloxacin
– MPNST
– MRI
– MRSI
– MS 209
– MS-275
– mucinous carcinoma
– mucosa-associated lymphoid tissue lymphoma
– muJ591 monoclonal antibody
– Müllerian tumor
– multicenter study
– multicentric breast cancer
– multidrug resistance
– multidrug resistance inhibition
– multifocal breast cancer
– multimodality treatment
– multiple endocrine adenomatosis
– multiple endocrine neoplasia syndrome
– multiple endocrine neoplasia type 1 syndrome
– multiple myeloma
– multiple sclerosis
– multiplicity
– muromonab-CD3 monoclonal antibody
– musculoskeletal
– mycophenolate mofetil
– mycosis fungoides
– mycostatin
– myelin
– myeloablation
– myelodysplasia
– myelodysplastic syndrome
– myelofibrosis
– myelogenous
– myelogram
– myeloid
– myeloma
– myeloproliferative disorder
– myelosclerosis with myeloid metaplasia
– myelosuppression
– myelosuppressive therapy
– myometrium

N 
N-acetylcysteine
– N-acetyldinaline
– N-butyl-N-(4-hydroxybutyl) nitrosamine
– naloxone
– National Cancer Institute
– National Institutes of Health
– natural killer cell
– NB1011
– NBI-3001
– NCI
– nebulizer
– neck dissection
– needle biopsy
– needle-localized biopsy
– negative axillary lymph node
– negative test result
– nelarabine
– nelfinavir mesylate
– neoadjuvant therapy
– neoplasia
– neoplasm
– nephrotomogram
– nephrotoxic
– nephroureterectomy
– nerve block
– nerve grafting
– nerve-sparing radical prostatectomy
– nerve-sparing surgery
– neuro-oncologist
– neurobehavioral
– neuroblastoma
– neuroectodermal tumor
– neuroendocrine
– neuroendocrine tumor
– neuroepithelial
– neurofibroma
– neurofibromatosis type I
– neurofibromatosis type 2
– neuroma
– neuron
– neuropathologist
– neuropathy
– neuropeptide
– neuroradiologist
– neurotoxicity
– neurotoxin
– neurotropism
– neutropenia
– neutrophil
– nevus
– NF1
– NG-monomethyl-L-arginine
– niacinamide
– nicotinamide
– NIH
– nilutamide
– nimodipine
– nipple discharge
– nitrocamptothecin
– nitrosourea
– NK cell
– NMRI
– node-negative
– node-positive
– nodular parenchyma
– nolatrexed
– non-Hodgkin's lymphoma
– non-small cell lung cancer (NSCLC)
– nonconsecutive case series
– noncontiguous lymphoma
– nonhematologic cancer
– noni
– nonlytic
– nonmalignant
– nonmalignant hematologic disorder
– nonmelanoma skin cancer
– nonmelanomatous
– nonmetastatic
– nonopioid
– nonprescription
– nonrandomized clinical trial
– nonseminoma
– nonspecific immune cell
– nonsteroidal anti-inflammatory drug
– nonsteroidal aromatase inhibitor
– novobiocin
– NPO
– NR-LU-10 antigen
– NSAID
– nuclear magnetic resonance imaging
– nuclear medicine scan
– nutraceutical
– nystatin

O 
O(6)-benzylguanine
– oat cell cancer
– objective improvement
– objective response
– oblimersen
– obtundation
– occult stage non-small cell lung cancer
– octreotide
– ocular melanoma
– ofloxacin
– OGX-011
– oblimersen
– oligoastrocytoma
– oligodendroglial tumor
– oligodendroglioma
– oltipraz
– omega-3 fatty acid
– omentectomy
– omentum
– omeprazole
– Ommaya reservoir
– oncogene
– oncologist
– oncology
– oncology nurse
– oncology pharmacy specialist
– oncolysate
– oncolysis
– oncolytic
– Oncolytic virus
– Onconase
– ondansetron
– ONYX-015
– oophorectomy
– open biopsy
– open colectomy
– open label study
– opioid
– opportunistic infection
– oral and maxillofacial surgeon
– orchidectomy
– orchiectomy
– oropharynx
– OSI-7904L
– osmolality
– osteitis deformans
– osteogenic sarcoma
– osteolytic
– osteoporosis
– osteosarcoma
– ostomy
– ovarian ablation
– ovarian epithelial cancer
– ovarian suppression
– Overall Survival (OS)
– overexpress
– overgrowth syndrome
– oxaliplatin
– oxandrolone
– OXi-104
– oxidative metabolism
– oxidative stress

P 
P-32
– p-value
– p53 gene
– Pacific valerian
– paclitaxel
– Paget's disease of bone
– Paget's disease of the nipple
– PALA
– palatine uvula
– palliative care
– palliative therapy
– Palmar plantar erythrodysesthesia
– pamidronate
– Pancoast's tumor
– pancreatectomy
– pancreatic cancer
– pancreatic duct
– pancreatic enzyme
– pancreatic juice
– pancreatitis
– PAP, same as Pap smear
– Pap smear
– Pap test, same as Pap smear
– papillary serous carcinoma
– papillary thyroid cancer
– papillary tumor
– papilledema
– paracentesis
– parageusia
– paramyxovirus
– paraneoplastic syndrome
– parathyroid gland
– parathyroid hormone
– parenchyma
– paresthesias
– paricalcitol
– parietal pericardium
– Parkinson's disease
– parotidectomy
– paroxetine hydrochloride
– partial cystectomy
– partial laryngectomy
– partial mastectomy
– partial nephrectomy
– partial oophorectomy
– partial remission
– partial response
– passive antibody therapy
– Paterson–Kelly syndrome
– pathological staging
– patient-controlled analgesia
– Patient derived tumor xenografts
– PCA
– PDQ
– peau d'orange
– PEG-interferon alfa-2a
– PEG-interferon alfa-2b
– PEG-MGDF
– pegaspargase
– pegfilgrastim
– PEITC
– peldesine
– pelvic exenteration
– pelvic lymphadenectomy
– pemetrexed disodium
– penclomedine
– penicillamine
– pentetic acid calcium
– pentosan polysulfate
– pentostatin
– pentoxifylline
– peptide
– peptide 946
– percutaneous ethanol injection
– percutaneous transhepatic biliary drainage
– percutaneous transhepatic cholangiodrainage
– percutaneous transhepatic cholangiography
– perfusion
– perfusion magnetic resonance imaging
– pericardial effusion
– perifosine
– perineal colostomy
– perineal prostatectomy
– peripheral blood lymphocyte therapy
– peripheral neuropathy
– peripheral primitive neuroectodermal tumor
– peripheral stem cell
– peripheral stem cell support
– peripheral stem cell transplantation
– peristalsis
– peritoneal cancer
– peritoneal infusion
– peritoneal perfusion
– pernicious anemia
– pertuzumab
– PET scan
– petechiae
– Peutz–Jeghers syndrome
– phagocyte
– pharmacokinetics
– phase I trial
– phase I/II trial
– phase II trial
– phase II/III trial
– phase III trial
– phase IV trial
– phenethyl isothiocyanate
– phenoxodiol
– phenylacetate
– phenylbutyrate
– pheochromocytoma
– pheresis
– Philadelphia chromosome
– photodynamic therapy
– photothermal therapy
– photofrin
– photopheresis
– phyllodes tumor
– Physician Data Query
– phytic acid
– phytoestrogen
– phytosterol
– PI-88
– pilocarpine
– pilocytic
– pineal region tumor
– pineoblastoma
– pineocytoma
– piperacillin/tazobactam
– pirfenidone
– piritrexim
– pixantrone
– PJS
– PKC412
– plasmacytic
– plasmacytoma
– plasmapheresis
– Plenaxis
– pleomorphic
– pleural effusion
– pleurodesis
– plexiform neurofibroma
– plexopathy
– ploidy
– Plummer–Vinson syndrome
– pluripotent
– pluripotent stem cell
– pM-81 monoclonal antibody
– PNET
– pneumonectomy
– PNU 166148
– PNU-93914
– polifeprosan 20 carmustine implant
– poly-ICLC
– polyglutamate camptothecin
– polyglutamate paclitaxel
– polymerase chain reaction
– polymorphism
– polyneuritis
– polyp
– polypectomy
– polyphenol
– Polyphenon E
– polyposis
– pons
– pontine
– porfimer sodium
– porfiromycin
– port-a-cath
– positive axillary lymph node
– positive test result
– positron emission tomography scan
– postremission therapy
– PR+
– PR-
– precancerous
– precancerous dermatitis
– precancerous dermatosis
– precancerous polyps
– predictive factor
– prednisolone
– prednisone
– preleukemia
– premalignant
– pretracheal space
– prevascular space
– preventive mastectomy
– primary central nervous system lymphoma
– primary endpoint
– primary myelofibrosis
– primary peritoneal cancer
– primary tumor
– primitive neuroectodermal tumor
– prinomastat
– pro-oxidant
– probenecid
– procarbazine
– prochlorperazine
– proctoscopy
– proctosigmoidoscopy
– progesterone receptor negative
– progesterone receptor positive
– progesterone receptor test
– progression-free survival (PFS)
– progressive disease
– proliferative index
– prolymphocytic leukemia
– promegapoietin
– promyelocytic leukemia
– prophylactic cranial irradiation
– prophylactic mastectomy
– prophylactic oophorectomy
– prophylactic surgery
– prophylaxis
– prospective cohort study
– Prost 30 monoclonal antibody
– prostate-specific antigen
– prostate-specific antigen test
– prostatectomy
– prostatic acid phosphatase
– prostatic intraepithelial neoplasia
– prostatitis
– protease inhibitor
– protein kinase C
– proteoglycan
– proteomic profile
– proteomics
– proton beam radiation therapy
– proton magnetic resonance spectroscopic imaging
– PS-341
– PSA
– psammoma body
– PSC 833
– pseudomyxoma peritonei
– psoralen
– PTC
– PTCD
– PTK787/ZK 222584
– ptosis
– pulmonary sulcus tumor
– PV701
– pyrazine diazohydroxide
– pyrazoloacridine
– pyroxamide

Q 
Q10
– QS21
– quadrantectomy

R 
R-flurbiprofen
– r-tPA
– R101933
– R115777
– radiation fibrosis
– radiation oncologist
– radiation physicist
– radiation surgery
– radiation therapist
– radiation therapy
– radical cystectomy
– radical lymph node dissection
– radical mastectomy
– radical perineal prostatectomy
– radical prostatectomy
– radical retropubic prostatectomy
– radioactive drug
– radioactive iodine
– radioactive palladium
– radioactive seed
– radiofrequency ablation
– radiographer
– radioimmunoguided surgery
– radioimmunotherapy
– radioisotope
– radiolabeled
– radiologic exam
– radionuclide scanning
– radiopharmaceutical
– radiosensitization
– radiosensitizer
– radiosurgery
– radiotherapy
– raloxifene
– raltitrexed
– randomized clinical trial
– ranpirnase
– rapamycin
– rapid hormone cycling
– rapid-onset opioid
– ras gene
– rasburicase
– rattlesnake root
– ravuconazole
– rebeccamycin
– recombinant tissue plasminogen activator
– reconstructive surgeon
– reconstructive surgery
– recurrent cancer
– Red blood cell
– Reed–Sternberg cell
– reflux
– refractory cancer
– regional cancer
– regional chemotherapy
– regional enteritis
– regional lymph node
– regional lymph node dissection
– rehabilitation specialist
– relative survival rate
– relaxation technique
– remission induction therapy
– remote brachytherapy
– renal cell cancer
– renal collecting tubule
– renal glomerulus
– renal tubular acidosis
– retinoblastoma
– retinoid
– retinol
– retinyl palmitate
– retroperitoneal
– retropubic prostatectomy
– retrospective cohort study
– retrospective study
– retroviral vector
– retrovirus
– RevM10 gene
– rhabdoid tumor
– rhabdomyosarcoma
– rhizoxin
– ribavirin
– ribonucleotide reductase inhibitor
– rifampin
– risedronate
– ritonavir
– rituximab
– RK-0202
– RMP-7
– RNA
– Ro 31-7453
– Ro 50-3821
– rofecoxib
– rosiglitazone
– RPI.4610
– RPR 109881A
– RSR13
– RSV

S 
S-1
– S-phase fraction
– safingol
– salpingo-oophorectomy
– salvage therapy
– samarium 153
– saponin
– saquinavir mesylate
– sarCNU
– sarcoma
– sarcosinamide nitrosourea
– sargramostim
– satraplatin
– SC-70935
– SCH 54031
– SCH 66336
– SCH-58500
– Schiller test
– Schwann cell
– schwannoma
– scintimammography
– scleroderma
– screening mammogram
– Scutellaria barbata
– SDX-102
– SDX-105
– second primary cancer
– second-line therapy
– second-look surgery
– secondary cancer
– sedoxantrone trihydrochloride
– segmental cystectomy
– segmental mastectomy
– selective estrogen receptor modulator
– selective serotonin reuptake inhibitor
– sella turcica
– semaxanib
– seminal vesicle biopsy
– seminoma
– semiparasitic
– semustine
– senile keratosis
– sentinel lymph node
– sentinel lymph node biopsy
– sentinel lymph node mapping
– seocalcitol
– SERM
– serotonin
– sertraline
– serum albumin
– serum glutamate pyruvate transaminase
– Serum glutamic oxaloacetic transaminase
– serum tumor marker test
– sesquiterpene lactone
– sestamibi breast imaging
– severe myelosuppression
– Sézary syndrome
– SGN-00101
– SGN-15
– SGOT
– SGPT
– sham therapy
– shave biopsy
– Sho-saiko-to
– sialic acid
– sialyl Tn-KLH
– side-to-end coloanal anastomosis
– sideropenic dysphagia
– sigmoidoscope
– sigmoidoscopy
– signal transduction inhibitor
– signet ring cell carcinoma
– SIL
– sildenafil
– Silybum marianum
– silymarin
– simple mastectomy
– simple nephrectomy
– single blind study
– single-photon emission computed tomography
– siplizumab
– sirolimus
– small cell lung cancer
– small intestine
– smoldering leukemia
– smoldering myeloma
– SMT-487
– SnET2
– SNX 111
– soblidotin
– sodium borocaptate
– sodium salicylate
– sodium sulfite
– sodium thiosulfate
– soft tissue sarcoma
– solar keratosis
– solid tumor
– somatic cell
– somatic mutation
– somnolence syndrome
– sonogram
– sorivudine
– specific immune cell
– SPECT
– SPF
– spiculated mass
– spindle cell cancer
– spindle cell sarcoma
– spiral CT scan
– splenomegaly
– sputum cytology
– squalamine lactate
– squamous cell
– squamous cell carcinoma
– squamous intraepithelial lesion
– SR-29142
– SR-45023A
– SR49059
– SSRI
– staging
– staurosporine
– stavudine
– stellate
– stem cell
– stem cell factor
– stem cell transplantation
– stent
– stereotactic biopsy
– stereotactic body radiation therapy
– stereotactic external-beam radiation
– stereotactic injection
– stereotactic radiation therapy
– stereotactic radiosurgery
– stereotaxic radiosurgery
– stereotaxis
– steroid therapy
– STI481
– STI571
– stoma
– stomatitis
– streptavidin
– streptozocin
– Stromagen
– stromal tumor
– strontium-89
– Sturge–Weber syndrome
– SU011248
– SU101
– SU5416
– SU6668
– subcutaneous port
– subependymal
– suberoylanilide hydroxamic acid
– subglottis
– subset analysis
– subtenon
– sucralfate
– sulfonamide
– sulindac
– superior vena cava
– superior vena cava syndrome
– supraclavicular lymph node
– supraglottic laryngectomy
– supraglottis
– supratentorial
– suramin
– surgical oncologist
– survival rate
– symptom management
– syncytium
– syngeneic bone marrow transplantation
– syngeneic stem cell transplantation
– synovial membrane
– synovial sarcoma
– synthetic protegrin analog
– synthetic retinoid
– systemic chemotherapy
– systemic disease
– systemic lupus erythematosus
– systemic therapy

T 
T cell
– T-3
– T-cell depletion
– T-cell lymphoma
– T138067
– T4N5 liposomal lotion
– T900607
– TAC-101
– tacrolimus
– TAG-72 antigen
– talampanel
– talaporfin sodium
– tamoxifen
– tariquidar
– taurolidine
– taxane
– technetium tc 99m dextran
– technetium tc 99m sulfur colloid
– tegafur
– teicoplanin
– telangiectasia
– temoporfin
– temozolomide
– teniposide
– TENS
– teratoma
– terminal disease
– tetanus toxoid
– tetrahydrouridine
– TG4010
– theophylline
– thermal ablation
– thermography
– thiotepa
– third-line therapy
– thoracentesis
– thoracoscopy
– thoracotomy
– thrombocyte
– thrombocytopenia
– thrombohemorrhagic event
– thrombophlebitis
– thrombopoietin
– thymidine
– thymidylate synthase inhibitor
– thymoma
– Thyrogen
– thyroglobulin
– thyroid follicular cell
– thyroid hormone
– thyroid-stimulating hormone
– thyroidectomy
– thyrotropin alfa
– tiazofurin
– time to progression
– tin ethyl etiopurpurin
– tin Sn 117m DTPA
– tinidazole
– tioguanine
– tipifarnib
– tirapazamine
– tissue plasminogen activator
– TLK286
– TM
– Transplacental carcinogenesis
– TNF
– TNFerade
– TNM staging system
– TNP-470
– tocladesine
– tomography
– topical chemotherapy
– topoisomerase inhibitor
– topotecan
– toremifene
– tositumomab
– total androgen blockade
– total estrogen blockade
– total nodal irradiation
– total parenteral nutrition
– total-body irradiation
– TP-38 immunotoxin
– tPA
– TPA
– trabecular cancer
– transabdominal ultrasound
– transcutaneous electric nerve stimulation
– transdermal
– transferrin-CRM107
– transitional cell
– transitional cell carcinoma
– transperineal biopsy
– transrectal biopsy
– transrectal ultrasound
– transurethral biopsy
– transurethral needle ablation
– transurethral resection
– transurethral resection of the prostate
– transvaginal ultrasound
– trastuzumab
– Traumeel S
– treosulfan
– tretinoin
– triacetyluridine
– triamcinolone
– Triapine
– tributyrin
– trichothiodystrophy
– triiodothyronine
– trimethoprim-sulfamethoxazole
– trimetrexate glucuronate
– triptorelin
– troglitazone
– tropisetron
– troxacitabine
– TRUS
– tuberous sclerosis
– tubulovillous adenoma
– tumor
– tumor antigen vaccine
– tumor board review
– tumor burden
– tumor debulking
– tumor infiltrating lymphocyte
– tumor load
– tumor marker
– tumor model
– tumor necrosis factor
– tumor suppressor gene
– tumor-derived
– tumor-specific antigen
– TUR
– TURP
– TVS
– tympany
– type I and type II errors
– tyrosinase peptide
– tyrosine kinase inhibitor
– TZT-1027

U 
ubiquinone
– UCN-01
– UGT1A1
– ultrasonogram
– ultrasonography
– ultrasound-guided biopsy—see ultrasound and biopsy
– ultraviolet radiation therapy—see ultraviolet radiation and radiation therapy
– uncontrolled study—see clinical trial
– unconventional cancer treatments—see experimental cancer treatment
– undifferentiated—see cellular differentiation
– unilateral salpingo-oophorectomy—see oophorectomy
– unresectable—see resection
– unresectable gallbladder cancer—see gallbladder cancer
– unsealed internal radiation therapy—see radiation therapy
– upper GI series
– urachus
– uracil
– urea nitrogen—see blood urea nitrogen
– ureteroscopy
– urine cytology—see urine
– urokinase
– urologic oncologist—see urology and oncologist
– urothelium
– ursodiol
– UV radiation
– UVA radiation
– UVB radiation
– uvula

V 
vaccine adjuvant
– vaccine therapy
– vaccinia CEA vaccine
– vaginal cancer – vaginal melanoma–vaginal tumors – valacyclovir
– valdecoxib
– valerian
– Valeriana officinalis
– Valerianae radix
– valganciclovir
– valproic acid
– vancomycin
– vapreotide
– varicose veins
– vascular endothelial growth factor
– VEGF
– VEGF Trap
– venlafaxine
– video-assisted resection
– video-assisted surgery
– villous adenoma
– villus
– vinblastine
– vinca alkaloid
– vincristine
– vindesine
– vinorelbine
– viral vector
– virotherapy
– virtual colonoscopy
– Virulizin
– virus replication cycle
– virus-neutralizing antibody
– viscotoxins
– visilizumab
– visual pathway glioma
– VNP20009
– VNP40101M
– von Hippel–Lindau disease
– voriconazole
– vorozole
– vulvar cancer
– VX 853
– VX-710

W 
Waldenström macroglobulinemia
– warfarin
– wedge resection
– Wermer's syndrome
– Whipple procedure
– white blood cell
– Whitmore-Jewett staging system
– whole cell vaccine
– Wilms' tumor
– Wobe-Mugos E

X 
X-ray
– X-ray therapy
– xenograft
– xeroderma pigmentosum
– xerogram
– xerostomia
– XK469
– XR9576

Y 
YM598
– yttrium Y 90 ibritumomab tiuxetan
– yttrium Y 90 SMT 487
– yttrium Y 90-DOTA-tyr3-octreotide

Z 
ZD 1839
– ZD0473
– ZD6474
– ziconotide
– zidovudine
– zileuton
– zoledronate
– Zollinger–Ellison syndrome
– Zoloft
– zolpidem
– zosuquidar trihydrochloride

References 

Oncology-related terms
Oncology